Thomas Wight, 1640–1724, was a native of Bandon, County Cork, Ireland, and author of the first History of the Quakers in Ireland. His father was Rice Wight, Church of Ireland minister of Bandon and a son of Thomas Wight, A.M. (fl. 1619-49) also a minister and a native of Guildford, Surrey.

While a clothier's apprentice, Wight attended Quaker meeting out of curiosity. He was impressed by a speech by Francis Howgill - "Before the eye can see, it must be opened; before the ear can hear, it must unstopped; and before the heart can understand, it must be illuminated." Edward Burrough was a further influence in causing Wight to move away from the Church of Ireland to becoming a Quaker himself.

He married in 1670 and had a large family. According to the History of Bandon.

References

External links
 http://www.paulturner.ca/Ireland/Cork/HOB/hob-17.htm

1640 births
1724 deaths
Converts to Quakerism
Irish Anglicans
Irish writers
Irish Quakers
People from County Cork
Historians of Quakerism
17th-century Irish people
18th-century Irish people